Good Timin' may refer to:

"Good Timin'" (The Beach Boys song), a song by The Beach Boys
"Good Timin'" (Jimmy Jones song), a UK #1 by Jimmy Jones